Jordan is an unincorporated hamlet in Fulton County, Kentucky, United States.

Jordan Station was a station on the Memphis and Ohio Railroad.  It currently consists of a few houses and a liquor store.

References

Unincorporated communities in Fulton County, Kentucky
Unincorporated communities in Kentucky